Thomas C. Boisture (March 23, 1931 – March 11, 2011) was an American football high school and college coach, a National Football League (NFL) scout, and the head of player personnel for the New York Giants.

Before joining the Giants, Boisture was a scout for the New England Patriots from 1970 to 1979.

He became the Director of Player Personnel for the New York Giants in 1980 and was named Vice President of Player Personnel in 1998.  He retired in 2000.

Super Bowl
Boisture was a member of the 1986 Super Bowl and 1990 Super Bowl winning Giants.

Giants like Lawrence Taylor, Mark Bavaro, Carl Banks, Michael Strahan and Amani Toomer were among the players who helped the Giants reach four Super Bowls during Boisture's tenure.

Coaching
Boisture began his coaching career at Austin Catholic Preparatory School in Detroit before becoming the head football coach at St. Ambrose High School in Grosse Pointe Park, Michigan.

Boisture then became an assistant coach at the University of Tulsa and then at the University of Houston.

He was the head football coach at the College of the Holy Cross from 1967 to 1968, compiling an 8–11–1 record as head coach.

Early years
Boisture was a star football player at Holy Redeemer High School in Detroit, Michigan.  He went on to play college football for Mississippi State University.

He was the younger brother of Dan Boisture, who served as head football coach at Eastern Michigan University from 1967 to 1973.

Personal life
A resident of Little Ferry, New Jersey, Boisture died of myelofibrosis on March 11, 2011.

Head coaching record

College

References

1931 births
2011 deaths
Holy Cross Crusaders football coaches
Houston Cougars football coaches
Mississippi State Bulldogs football players
New England Patriots scouts
New York Giants executives
Tulsa Golden Hurricane football coaches
High school football coaches in Michigan
People from Little Ferry, New Jersey
Players of American football from Detroit
Coaches of American football from Michigan
Holy Redeemer High School (Detroit) alumni